James Brett could refer to: 

James Brett (cricketer), English cricketer who played in the 1800s
James Seymour Brett (born 1974), English composer and conductor
James T. Brett (born 1949), American politician
Jim Brett, American business executive